Aldhal may refer to:

 Aldhal, Belgaum, village in Hukeri Taluka, Belgaum District, Karnataka, India
 Aldhal, Shahapur, village in Shahapur Taluka, Yadgir District, Karnataka, India
 Aldhal, Shorapur, panchayat village in Shorapur Taluka, Yadgir District, Karnataka, India
 Aldhal, Raichur, village in Manvi Taluka, Raichur District, Karnataka, India